James Burgess Jr. (September 26, 1857 – January 5, 1950) was a Canadian politician. He served in the Legislative Assembly of New Brunswick as a member from Victoria County.

References 

1857 births
1950 deaths